The 2016–17 Tennessee Tech Golden Eagles men's basketball team represented Tennessee Technological University during the 2016–17 NCAA Division I men's basketball season. The Golden Eagles, led by sixth-year head coach Steve Payne, played their home games at the Eblen Center in Cookeville, Tennessee and were members of the East Division of the Ohio Valley Conference. They finished the season 12–20, 8–8 in OVC play to finish in a tie for fourth place in the East Division. As the No. 6 seed in the OVC tournament, they lost in the first round to  Murray State.

Previous season 
The Eagles finished the 2015–16 season 19–12, 11–5 in OVC play to finish in a three-way tie for second place in the East Division. They lost in the first round of the OVC tournament to Austin Peay. They were invited to the inaugural Vegas 16, which only had 8 teams, where they lost in the quarterfinals to Old Dominion.

Preseason 
In a vote of Ohio Valley Conference head men's basketball coaches and sports information directors, Tennessee Tech was picked to finish in fourth place in the East Division of the OVC. Aleksa Jugovic was selected to the All-OVC Preseason Team.

Roster

Schedule and results

|-
!colspan=9 style=| Non-conference regular season

|-
!colspan=9 style=| Ohio Valley Conference regular season

|-
!colspan=9 style=| Ohio Valley Conference tournament

References

Tennessee Tech Golden Eagles men's basketball seasons
Tennessee Tech
Tennessee Tech Golden Eagles men's basketball
Tennessee Tech Golden Eagles men's basketball